The 2014-15 Namibia Premier League is the 26th season of top-tier football in Namibia. The season started on 11 October 2014. Black Africa S.C. are the defending champions, coming off their fourth consecutive title.

Teams
A total of 16 teams will contest the league, which expanded from 12 clubs in the 2013-14 season. Rundu Chiefs and Blue Boys F.C. were both relegated to First Division after finishing 11th and 12th, respectively, the previous season while Ramblers F.C. also dropped out from the previous year's league. Benfica F.C., Citizens F.C., Julinho Sporting F.C., Mighty Gunners F.C., Rebels F.C., Touch & Go F.C. and University of Namibia are all new additions to the competition this year.

Stadiums and locations

League table

References

2014 in African association football leagues
Seasons in Namibian football leagues